Deschooling is a term invented by Austrian philosopher Ivan Illich. Today, the word is mainly used by homeschoolers, especially unschoolers, to refer to the transition process that children and parents go through when they leave the school system in order to start homeschooling. It is a crucial process that is the basis for homeschooling to work, in which children should slowly break out of their school routine and mentality, develop the ability to learn via self-determination again, and find interests to decide what they want to learn in their first homeschool days. Depending on the type of person and time the child spent in the school system, this phase can last different lengths of time and may have different effects on the behavior of children. Especially in the first days of deschooling, it is often the case that children mainly want to recover from the school surroundings and therefore will generally sleep very long and refuse any kind of intentional learning and instead search for substitute satisfactions like watching TV or playing video games, very similar to the behavior during early school holidays. Moving on in this transition process, children may feel bored or cannot cope well with the missing daily structure, until they eventually find out how to make use of their time and freedom to find interests, which in the best case results in them voluntarily informing themselves about certain things they are interested in, whereupon homeschooling can start.

Often considered a recreation or healing step from the school environment, many followers of the modern homeschool movement consider this step more or less necessary as many of them tend to believe that the school system can cause great damage to the innate creativity, curiosity and willingness to learn in children, claiming that most children would only study under unnatural extrinsic pressure like grades instead of for themselves in school and what, when, how, and with whom to learn was always pre-determined instead of self-determinable there.

Background
Deschooling is mainly credited to Ivan Illich, who felt that the traditional schooling children received needed to be reconstructed. He believed that schools contained a "hidden curriculum" that caused learning to align with grades and accreditation rather than important skills. Illich believed that the modern school is grounded on a foundation that is focused on growing schools as an industrialized system. Illich communicated that the school system has formed a toxic industry that specializes in what families should be capable of forming themselves, namely education. According to Illich, schools align success on paper with academic excellence. He presumed that schools, grades, and diplomas gave false assumptions that the students have become knowledgeable in a certain educational concept.

John Holt was an educator who also believed in deschooling. His thoughts were closely aligned with Illich because neither were convinced that school was the place that taught students everything they needed to know. Instead, they communicated that school was not the sole avenue for learning because students learn consistently through other facets, such as exposure to the natural world. As a result, Illich and Holt saw schools as being insufficient because of their focus on strictly doing "skill drill" instead of other methods of learning. Additionally, theorists of deschooling saw education as maintaining the social order. Therefore, they wanted to "denounce the monopoly that traditional education institutions held on education and learning."

Unschooling/deschooling society
"Deschooling" a person does not mean disregarding the act of learning or studying in schools. Illich and Holt's image of an unschooled society would ensure that everybody has the choice of whether they attend school. Rather than being forced to go to school, taking a test before entering a school or being denied the opportunity to learn a desired topic, people would be free to choose how they learn. According to John Holt, an advocate for unschooling, "a deschooled society would be a society in which everyone shall have the widest and freest possible choice to learn whatever he wants to learn, whether in school or in some altogether different way." Holt later began to use the term "unschooling" to encompass his educational belief system.

See also 
 Deschooling Society
Anti-schooling activism

References

External links 
Deschooling: How Long Does it Take?
Deschooling on www.homeschool.com
How to Transition from Public School to Homeschool on Wikihow

Education theory
Alternative education
Homeschooling
Lifestyles
Philosophy of education
Pedagogy